Collingwood College is a government school located in the inner-city suburb of Collingwood, close to the Melbourne CBD.

Established in 1882, it is one of Melbourne's oldest inner city schools.

The school has two modern campuses: its main campus is near Hoddle Street, on the corner of Cromwell Street and McCutcheon Way. As of 2022, it shares a senior campus for VCE students with Fitzroy High School.

History 
In 1882, the Vere Street National School No 2462 was established. Cromwell Street State School joined Vere Street National School in 1912. In 1915, Collingwood Domestic Arts School was established. In 1975, the Collingwood Education Centre was established. It was renamed Collingwood College in 1990. A history of Collingwood College entitled The School on the Flat: Collingwood College 1882-2007 was published to mark the 125th anniversary of the school's opening.

Academics
VCE studies offered by the school:Biology, Business Management, Chinese First Language, Chinese Second Language, English, English (EAL), Further Mathematics, General Mathematics, Literature, Mathematical Methods (CAS), Media, Product Design and Technology, Psychology, Specialist Mathematics, Studio Arts, Visual Communication Design.

See also 
 Education in Australia

References

External links 
 Collingwood College website

Public high schools in Melbourne
Public primary schools in Melbourne
Educational institutions established in 1882
1882 establishments in Australia
Buildings and structures in the City of Yarra